The 2010 World Thoroughbred Rankings was the 2010 edition of the World Thoroughbred Rankings. It was an assessment of Thoroughbred racehorses issued by the International Federation of Horseracing Authorities (IFHA) in January 2011. It included horses aged three or older which competed in flat races during 2010. It was open to all horses irrespective of where they raced or were trained.

This year's highest rating was awarded to Harbinger for his performance in the King George VI and Queen Elizabeth Stakes. He was given a rating of 135. A total of 329 horses were included in the list, four fewer than the previous year.

Full rankings for 2010
 For a detailed guide to this table, see below.

Top ranked horses
The following table shows the top ranked horses overall, the top three-year-olds, the top older horses and the top fillies and mares in the 2010 Rankings. It also shows the leading performers in various subdivisions of each group, which are defined by the distances of races, and the surfaces on which they are run.

Guide
A complete guide to the main table above.

References

World Thoroughbred Racehorse Rankings
World Thoroughbred Rankings 2010